Raymond Y. Chiao is an American physicist best known for his experimental work in quantum optics. He is currently an emeritus faculty member at the University of California, Merced physics department, where he is conducting research on gravitational radiation.

Biography
Raymond Chiao was born in Hong Kong on October 9, 1940, and moved as a child to the United States in 1947. He grew up in New York City, where he attended Collegiate School. It was there that he first got interested in science through reading Gamow’s book One Two Three... Infinity.

He was admitted to Princeton University in 1957 as an electrical engineer, but then switched to the physics department, where he worked on a senior thesis project given to him by John Archibald Wheeler on the quantization of general relativity. He then switched from theoretical physics to experimental physics in graduate studies at MIT under the supervision of Charles Hard Townes, shortly after the experimental realization of the ruby laser. His thesis topic was on the first observation of stimulated Brillouin scattering.

After obtaining his Ph.D. in 1965 from MIT, he taught as an assistant professor there until 1967. He moved to UC Berkeley in 1967, and remained there until 2006, after which he took a position at the UC's newly opened campus UC Merced.

Discoveries
Chiao has become well known in the field of quantum optics due to several important experiments. Based on former experiments carried out by Günter Nimtz in 1992 he measured the quantum tunnelling time, which was found to be between 1.5 and 1.7 times the speed of light. Interpretation of these results is open to question (see references below pertaining to tunneling time). He also was the first to measure the topological Berry's Phase (Geometric phase).

Current work
As of 2006, he accepted a faculty position at UC Merced and turned his full energy on the project of detecting gravitational waves through the use of superconductors. As of 2010 he became emeritus faculty but he continues to advise several PhD Students.

Bibliography

Books
 Quantum Optics by John Garrison, Raymond Chiao
 Amazing Light by Raymond Chiao

Articles
 A. M. Steinberg and R. Y. Chiao Tunneling delay times in one and two dimensions Phys. Rev. A 49, 3283 - 3295 (1994)
http://prola.aps.org/abstract/PRA/v49/i5/p3283_1
 A. Tomita and R. Y. Chiao Observation of Berry's Topological Phase by Use of an Optical Fiber Phys. Rev. Lett. 57, 937 - 940 (1986)
http://prola.aps.org/abstract/PRL/v57/i8/p937_1
 Steinberg, A. M., Kwiat, P. G. & R. Y. Chiao 1993: "Measurement of the Single-Photon Tunneling Time" in Physical Review Letters 71, S. 708–711

References

External links
Chiao's UC Merced faculty bio page 
Chiao's UC Merced web page

Tunnelling time
http://scienceworld.wolfram.com/physics/TunnelingTime.html
http://www.aei.mpg.de/~mpoessel/Physik/FTL/tunnelingftl.html
http://www.lambmedal.org/2006/2006-chiao.html

Media coverage
http://physicsworld.com/blog/2009/04/can_gravitional_waves_be_detec.html
https://web.archive.org/web/20081030003747/http://edition.cnn.com/2000/TECH/space/07/20/speed.of.light.ap/ 
https://www.nytimes.com/2002/03/26/science/discussing-the-nature-of-reality-between-buffets.html 
https://www.nytimes.com/2002/03/26/science/discussing-the-nature-of-reality-between-buffets.html 
http://www.sfgate.com/cgi-bin/examiner/article.cgi?year=1997&month=08&day=11&article=NEWS378.dtl 
http://www.scientificamerican.com/article.cfm?id=a-philosophers-stone
http://www.ucmerced.edu/news/2005/renowned-berkeley-physicist-raymond-chiao-join-uc-merced-faculty

1940 births
Living people
21st-century American physicists
Fellows of Optica (society)
Hong Kong emigrants to the United States
MIT Department of Physics alumni
Optical physicists
Quantum gravity physicists
Princeton University alumni
Scientists from New York City
University of California, Berkeley College of Letters and Science faculty
University of California, Merced faculty
Collegiate School (New York) alumni
Hong Kong physicists